Uscenum or Véskenon (Ancient Greek: Οὔσκενον / Οὔεσκενον.) was an ancient city mentioned by Ptolemy. It was located between the Middle Danube and the Tisza River, in what was considered the territory of the Iazyges Metanastæ.

References 

Sarmatians